The Kuala Terengganu District is a district in the state of Terengganu, Malaysia. It covers an area of 210.21 square kilometres, and had a population of 343,284 at the 2010 Census . The district is bordered by Terengganu River which separates Kuala Nerus District in the north and west, Marang District in the south and South China Sea in the east. The capital of this district is Kuala Terengganu.

Administrative divisions 

Kuala Terengganu District is divided into 20 mukims/sub-districts, which are:

 Atas Tol
 Bandar
 Batu Buruk
 Belara
 Bukit Besar
 Cabang Tiga
 Cenering
 Gelugur Kedai
 Gelugur Raja
 Kepung
 Kuala Ibai
 Kubang Parit
 Losong
 Manir
 Paluh
 Pengadang Buluh
 Pulau-pulau
 Rengas
 Serada
 Tok Jamal

Demographics

Federal Parliament and State Assembly Seats 

List of Kuala Terengganu district representatives in the Federal Parliament (Dewan Rakyat)

List of Kuala Terengganu district representatives in the State Legislative Assembly of Terengganu

See also
 Districts of Malaysia

References